Hall County is the name of several counties in the United States:

 Hall County, Georgia
 Hall County, Nebraska
 Hall County, Texas